Monstrotyphis goniodes is a species of sea snail, a marine gastropod mollusk, in the family Muricidae, the murex snails or rock snails.

Description
The length of the shell attains 9.5 mm.

Distribution
This marine species occurs in Oman.

References

goniodes
Gastropods described in 2017